Commodity feminism theorizes that the mass media appropriates feminism for commercial purposes, using it as a vehicle to sell consumer products and services. By associating brands with key concepts surrounding feminism, such as the idea that women are empowered and strong, marketers and advertisers use feminism in ways that are internally contradictory and appropriative.

The term "commodity feminism" was developed and articulated by Goldman, Heath, and Smith in a 1991 essay in Critical Studies in Mass Communication. This essay noted that femininity and feminism have been in opposition, with feminism critical of the ways in which femininity is used to marginalize and oppress women. The authors argued, in part, that in the marketplace, "Femininity and feminism become presented as interchangeable alternatives" through the "logic of market segments and product differentiation," transforming "feminism into a manipulable set of semiotic markers -- confidence and attitude -- which bear the meanings of individual freedom and independence associated with feminism. Terms like 'attitude' and 'confidence' [...] represent what can be acquired through the right consumer choices" (p. 348).

Influence on feminist scholarship 

Since the article's publication in 1991, commodity feminism has become a major concept that is broadly applied in feminist media studies, cited frequently by other scholars, many of whom apply it in their analysis of media and popular culture. For example, it has informed critical analyses of topics including telenovelas, girl power, children's media, TV shows such as Sex and the City, and pop stars such as Beyoncé. It has also informed the rise of new, related terms, such as "femvertising".

The term "commodity feminism" brings to mind the term "commodity fetishism" and added a new dimension to it, as Kirsten Howard has noted.

Examples 
The Spice Girls, the Virginia Slims' "You've Come A Long Way, Baby" campaign, The Dove Campaign for Real Beauty, the Fearless Girl statue, the Always #LikeAGirl  campaign, and women requiring deodorant “Strong Enough For A Man” put on Secret. are among the many products and advertising campaigns have been cited as examples as commodity feminism.

Today, commodity feminism is particularly pervasive in representations of femininity in popular culture. Such things in advertising present the viewer with “narrow stifling stereotypes”  which may come across as empowering females or degrading while working against the feminist movement. “Young women of the world, two things are lacking in your life: gender equality and shiny hair. And we can help you achieve at least one of those things.”. A quote from a Pantene ad also using class commodity feminism to claim to fix gender inequality with a product; shampoo.

Critiques 
"Much contemporary advertising, including the examples mentioned above, engages in obfuscation of the labour and product-ness of the commodity being presented.  Value is instead assigned or implied by linking the commodity to a particular lifestyle, identity or social cause.  Commodity feminism is one example of the addition of an ideological layer that distracts from the origins and nature of the commodity advertised."

The term pays homage to Marx’s notion of “commodity fetishism” and is often framed within contemporary Marxist and feminist terms. The definition of commodity feminism and commodity fetishism go hand in hand. Commodity fetishism is the relation of production and exchange of social relationships involving money and merchandise. The use of fetishism towards females has been occurring for decades, but within the use of ads in the consumerism increase, this commodity fetishism has created commodity feminism. Consumerism has taken over enough for feminism to be used and become a commodity that is profitable. This profit off feminism has consumers in debate about how far it can go as well as if it is morally correct to be exploiting a fight that has been fought by women for decades. These advertisement that are making feminism a commodity have done things like promote “real beauty” and to tackle body image disorders among young women. Some of these campaigns can not only portray the opposite of what they claim to be feminism but can have real side effects on the credibility of feminism.

"Also valid is the comment that the “you be you” message of these ads is at odds with the very nature of marketing, which emphasizes a lack or imperfection in order to then provide a product with which to solve this “problem”." As said by Kristen Howard, the nature of marketing; fixing a problem, being involved with feminism can be contradictory as the "you be you" message as companies try to convince us that buying their product will support the feminine cause.

See also 

Astroturfing
 Brigitte Vasallo
 Ethnocentrism
 Feminationalism
 Femvertising
 Greenwashing
 Homonationalism
 Intersectionality
 Islamic feminism
 Pinkwashing
 Redwashing
 Postcolonialism
 Whitewashing

References

Feminist economics
Consumerism